Phorcus mariae is a species of sea snail, a marine gastropod mollusk in the family Trochidae, the top snails.

Distribution
This species occurs in the Atlantic Ocean off the Cape Verde Islands.

References

External links
 To World Register of Marine Species

mariae
Gastropods described in 2012
Gastropods of Cape Verde